Ingerophrynus divergens is a species of toad in the family Bufonidae. It is found in Malay Peninsula (Thailand, presumably Malaysia), Borneo (Brunei, Indonesia, and Malaysia), Sumatra, and Natuna Islands. It occurs in well-drained lowland rainforests. It breeds in standing water and slow-moving intermittent streams. It is widespread in suitable habitat but not abundant. It is threatened by habitat loss caused by clear-cutting.

This toad species is known to be a possible host for various helminths, including Seuratascaris numidica and Pseudoacanthocephalus bufonis. Both of which are novel appearances of these parasitic organisms in I. divergens.

References

divergens
Amphibians of Brunei
Amphibians of Indonesia
Amphibians of Malaysia
Amphibians of Thailand
Amphibians of Borneo
Fauna of Sumatra
Amphibians described in 1871
Taxa named by Wilhelm Peters
Taxonomy articles created by Polbot